Greene House may refer to:

Ernest Edward Greene House, Cullman, Alabama, listed on the NRHP in Cullman County, Alabama
Greene-Marston House, Mobile, Alabama, NRHP-listed
Greene Thomas House, Leslie, Arkansas, listed on the NRHP in Searcy County, Arkansas
John T. Greene House, Sacramento, California, listed on the NRHP in Sacramento County, California
Greene-Lewis House, Tallahassee, Florida, NRHP-listed
George Greene House, Midland, Michigan, listed on the NRHP in Midland County, Michigan
Benjamin F. Greene House, Central Falls, Rhode Island, NRHP-listed
Nathanael Greene Homestead, Coventry, Rhode Island, NRHP-listed
Christopher Rhodes Greene House, Coventry, Rhode Island, NRHP-listed
Caleb Greene House, Warwick, Rhode Island, NRHP-listed
Greene-Bowen House, Warwick, Rhode Island, NRHP-listed
Greene-Durfee House, Warwick, Rhode Island, NRHP-listed
Moses Greene House, Warwick, Rhode Island, NRHP-listed
Peter Greene House, Warwick, Rhode Island, NRHP-listed
Richard Wickes Greene House, Warwick, Rhode Island, NRHP-listed
Nelson H. Greene House, Ritzville, Washington, listed on the NRHP in Adams County, Washington
James Greene House, Yakima, Washington, listed on the NRHP in Yakima County, Washington
Thomas A. Greene Memorial Museum, Milwaukee, Wisconsin, NRHP-listed

See also
Green House (disambiguation)